Chiwetel Ejiofor is a British actor and filmmaker who has received various awards and nominations, including a British Academy Film Award. He has received additional nominations for one Academy Award, one British Film Academy Award, five Golden Globe Awards, two Primetime Emmy Awards, and three Screen Actors Guild Awards.

For his performance in the British play Blue/Orange in 2000, Ejiofor received a Critics' Circle Theatre Award, an Evening Standard Theatre Award, and a nomination for the Laurence Olivier Award for Best Actor in a Supporting Role. In 2002, he starred in the social thriller film Dirty Pretty Things, leading to Best Actor awards at the British Independent Film Awards and the Evening Standard British Film Awards. He was nominated for the inaugural BAFTA Rising Star Award in 2006. At the 64th Golden Globe Awards, the following year, Ejiofor was nominated for his performances in Kinky Boots and the television miniseries Tsunami: The Aftermath. In 2008, he received the Laurence Olivier Award for Best Actor and a Critics' Circle Theatre Award for playing the title character in Othello, and he was awarded an OBE by Queen Elizabeth II for services to drama. At the 67th Golden Globe Awards, he received a nomination for Best Actor in a Miniseries or Motion Picture Made for Television for playing South African politician Thabo Mbeki in Endgame (2009).

Ejiofor received numerous accolades for playing American abolitionist Solomon Northup in the 2013 biographical period drama film 12 Years a Slave. He received the BAFTA Award for Best Actor in a Leading Role and was nominated for the Academy Award for Best Actor. Additionally, he won Best Actor awards at the 3rd AACTA International Awards and the 14th BET Awards, and was nominated at the 71st Golden Globe Awards, the 20th Screen Actors Guild Awards, the 19th Critics' Choice Awards, and the 18th Satellite Awards. In 2013, he also starred in the BBC television drama Dancing on the Edge, for which he was nominated for a Golden Globe Award, a Primetime Emmy Award, and a Satellite Award. Ejiofor was awarded a CBE in 2015. 

Ejiofor's feature directorial debut, The Boy Who Harnessed the Wind, earned him the Alfred P. Sloan Prize at the 2019 Sundance Film Festival. He was nominated for Outstanding Narrator at the 72nd Primetime Emmy Awards for narrating the documentary The Elephant Queen.

Awards and nominations

Notes

References

External links
 

Lists of awards received by British actor